김 is a Korean hangul character, which can be romanized as Gim or Kim, it may refer to:

Gim (food)
Kim (Korean surname)

See also
Hangul Syllables, the Unicode block containing this character